The Minas Republican Party (PRM), sometimes translated as the Mineiro Republican Party, was a Brazilian political party founded on 4 June 1888 and active during the First Brazilian Republic. It represented the republican ideology of the agrarian elite of the state of Minas Gerais. Along with the PRP of São Paulo, it was one of Brazil's two most powerful political parties from its foundation to the creation of the Estado Novo regime.

It was initially controlled by politicians of Sul e Sudoeste de Minas until Artur Bernardes moved its control core to the Zona da Mata. Its executive committee (the "tarasca") was very powerful and took all the major decisions.

As with all Brazilian parties of the time, the PRM was abolished at the advent of the Estado Novo.

Main representatives
Afonso Pena: President of Brazil (1906–1909)
Venceslau Brás: President of Brazil (1914–1918)
Delfim Moreira: President of Brazil (1918–1919)
Epitácio Pessoa: President of Brazil (1919–1922)
Artur Bernardes: President of Brazil (1922–1926)
Antônio Carlos Ribeiro de Andrada: President of the State of Minas Gerais (1926–1930)

Bibliography
CALICCIO, Vera, Partido Republicano Mineiro (PRM) 

First Brazilian Republic
Defunct political parties in Brazil
Political parties disestablished in 1937
Political parties established in 1888
Republican parties
Federalist parties
Liberal parties in Brazil
Coffee with milk politics
Conservative parties in Brazil
1888 establishments in Brazil
1937 disestablishments in Brazil